The tenth season, also known as the anniversary season of the talent show The Voice of Germany premiered on October 8, 2020 on ProSieben and on October 11, 2020 on Sat.1. Mark Forster returned as coach for his fourth season and Rea Garvey returned for his sixth season, but this time paired up as a duo with Samu Haber, who returned for his fifth season; Haber last coached in the seventh season. Yvonne Catterfeld and Stefanie Kloß, who last coached in the eighth season and in the fifth season, respectively, returned as coaches and as a duo. In the last season Nico Santos was featured as an off-screen fifth coach for Comeback Stage contestants; this season he returned as a main coach in the red chair. The role of fifth coach belonged to Michael Schulte, who selected contestants to participate in The Voice: Comeback Stage by SEAT. Thore Schölermann returned for his ninth season as host. Lena Gercke also returned for her sixth season as host, but she was only in the live shows phase, due of her pregnancy. Annemarie Carpendale replaced Gercke in the others stages of the show.

Paula Dalla Corte was named the winner of the season on December 20, 2020 and Samu Haber & Rea Garvey became the third duo coach to win The Voice of Germany.

Production

Coaches and hosts

On June 19, 2020, it was announced that Sido would not be returning to the show. On June 25, 2020, it was announced that also Alice Merton will not be returning. The new coaches and host were announced on July 17, 2020. For the first time in The Voice of Germany history, there will be six coaches; 2 duos and 2 solos. Mark Forster and Rea Garvey returned for the tenth season. Nico Santos who in the last season was the fifth coach, mentoring unsuccessful auditioners on an online version in a new round called The Voice: Comeback Stage by SEAT, returned but this time as a main coach. Yvonne Catterfeld returned after a one-year hiatus, Samu Haber returned after a two-year hiatus and after a four-year hiatus Stefanie Kloss also returned to the show. The 2 duo coaches were Haber & Garvey and Catterfeld & Kloss. This is also the first time in the history of The Voice of Germany that there will be a girl duo coach. Forster and Santos are the 2 solos coaches. It was announced that Lena Gercke will not be returning to host the show due to pregnancy, but she will host the live shows. Annemarie Carpendale replaced Gercke as the host for the tenth season, only for the blind auditions, battle rounds and sing offs. On July 21, 2020, it was announced that Michael Schulte would become this year's fifth coach, mentoring unsuccessful auditioners as well as eliminated artists from later rounds of the competition, on the online version The Voice: Comeback Stage by SEAT.

This season features 10 contestants who had previously appeared on previous seasons of the show, they are called the "Allstars".

Scouting
The scoutings with the producers began on February 7, 2020 in Hamburg and ended on February 29, 2020 in Berlin but not shown on television. On April 17 and 18, 2020, it was announced that the Last Chance Days which would take place in Berlin was cancelled because of the coronavirus pandemic in Germany, but the production announced that the participants could send a video to apply for this season.

Teams

Blind auditions
The blind auditions were recorded from July 17, 2020 to July 22, 2020 at Studio Adlershof in Berlin and were broadcast from October 8, 2020 until November 5, 2020, being broadcast every Thursday on ProSieben and every Sunday on Sat.1.

Color key

Episode 1 (October 8) 
The first blind audition episode was broadcast on October 8, 2020 on ProSieben.

 Coaches Performance: "Viva la Vida"

Episode 2 (October 11) 
The second blind audition episode was broadcast on October 11, 2020 on Sat.1.

Episode 3 (October 15) 
The third blind audition episode was broadcast on October 15, 2020 on ProSieben.

Episode 4 (October 18) 
The fourth blind audition episode was broadcast on October 18, 2020 on Sat.1.

Episode 5 (October 22) 
The fifth blind audition episode was broadcast on October 22, 2020 on ProSieben.

Episode 6 (October 25) 
The sixth blind audition episode was broadcast on October 25, 2020 on Sat.1.

Episode 7 (October 29) 
The seventh blind audition episode was broadcast on October 29, 2020 on ProSieben.

Episode 8 (November 1) 
The eighth blind audition episode was broadcast on November 1, 2020 on Sat.1.

Episode 9 (November 5) 
The ninth and final blind audition episode was broadcast on November 5, 2020 on ProSieben.

Battle rounds
The battle rounds were recorded from September 11, 2020 to September 13, 2020 in Berlin and were broadcast from November 8, 2020 until November 22, 2020, being broadcast like the blind auditions every Thursday on ProSieben and every Sunday on Sat.1.

The coaches can steal two losing artist from other coaches.

Color key

Sing offs
The sing offs were recorded in Berlin from October 22, 2020 to October 23, 2020 and were broadcast from November 26, 2020 on ProSieben until December 6, 2020 on Sat.1. Coach Samu Haber was missing on the second day of the recordings, after he tested positive for the Coronavirus. This season's advisors were Joy Denalane for Team Mark, Clueso for Team Yvonne & Stefanie, Lea for Team Nico and David Guetta for Team Samu & Rea.

Color key

Comeback Stage
This season's fifth coach, Michael Schulte, mentored selected artists who did not make a team during the Blind Auditions as well as eliminated artists from later rounds of the competition, thus creating new rounds to The Voice: Comeback Stage by SEAT that was exclusive to thevoiceofgermany.de. The two winners competed in the Live Shows against the talents of the coaches Mark Forster, Yvonne Catterfeld & Stefanie Kloss, Nico Santos and Samu Haber & Rea Garvey live on television for a chance to win the tenth season of The Voice of Germany.

First round
During the first round of competition, the eight selected artists from Blind Auditions went head to head, two artists per episode, and Schulte selected a winner to move on to the next round.

Second round
In the second round, the four remaining artists chose another song to sing, with two of them advancing to the next round.

Third round
In the third round, Schulte brought back two artists who were eliminated during the Battle rounds, giving them a chance to re-enter in the competition. These artists faced off against the two artists from the second round.

Final round
In the final round, the two winners of the third round competed against two eliminated artists from the Sing Offs. From these four artists, two advanced in the Live Shows.

Live shows
The live shows began on December 13, 2020 on Sat.1. Each coach has in his/her team 2 artists. For the first time in the German version, viewers can vote for their favorites artists via online voting on thevoice.de. There is still the possibility of telephone and SMS voting.

Week 1: Semifinal (December 13)
The semi-final was aired on December 13, 2020, with two acts from each team performing. The public chose one artist from each team to advance to the final. On December 8, 2020, it was announced that Noah Sam Honegger will not be participating in the live shows for health reasons and will be replaced by Oliver Henrich.

Color key

Week 2: Final (December 20)
The final aired on December 20, 2020. In the final week, the five finalists performed a solo cover song, an original duet song with their coach and a duet with a special guest.

Elimination chart
Coaches color key

Results color key

Overall

Team

Contestants who appeared on previous season
 George Philippart was already part of The Voice of Germany in the fifth season. As Sabrina, he made it into the battles on Rea Garvey's team.
 Michelle Schulz was in the sixth season, where she was eliminated in the blind auditions.
 Gregory Krause was in the first season of The Voice Kids, where he was in team Tim Bendzko and he was eliminated in the battle rounds.
 Isabel Nolte was in the fourth season of The Voice of Holland, where she was in team Ilse DeLange and she was eliminated in the battle rounds.

Allstar
 Pamela Falcon competed on the show's first season, where she was mentored by Rea Garvey and was eliminated in the battle rounds.
 Matthias Nebel was in the eighth season, where he was mentored by Michael Patrick Kelly and was eliminated in the semi-final.
 Juan Geck was in the seventh season, his coach was Yvonne Catterfeld and was eliminated in the sing offs.
 Janina Beyerlein was in the team from Samu Haber in the seventh season and was eliminated in the semi-final.
 Dimi Rompos auditioned for season two, but did not get a chair turn. In the fifth season, she auditioned again in the show and was in team Stefanie Kloss. She was eliminated in the Semi-final.
 Alex Hartung participated in the fourth season. He was in team Michi Beck & Smudo and was eliminated in the battle rounds, but he was stolen by Rea Garvey and then was eliminated in the first live show.
 Maciek was in the ninth season, where he was coached by Mark Forster and was eliminated in the sing offs.
 Keye Katcher was in the second season in team The BossHoss, where he was eliminated in the Semi-final.
 Michael Caliman was in the sixth season. He was in team Andreas Bourani and was eliminated in the Semi-final.
 BB Thomaz was in the seventh season, in team Yvonne Catterfeld and she received the fourth place in the final.

Ratings

References

External links
 Official website on ProSieben.de
 The Voice of Germany on fernsehserien.de

2020 German television seasons
10